The Polymer Battery Experiment (PBEX) demonstrates the charging and discharging characteristics of polymer batteries in the space environment. PBEX validates use of lightweight, flexible battery technology to decrease cost and weight for future military and commercial space systems. PBEX was developed by Johns Hopkins University and is one of four On Orbit Mission Control (OOMC) packages on PicoSat 9:
 Polymer Battery Experiment
 Ionospheric Occultation Experiment
 Coherent Electromagnetic Radio Tomography
 Optical Precision Platform Experiment

Specifications
NSSDC ID: 2001-043B-03
Mission: PicoSAT 9

Sources
NASA: Picosat Experiment Package 2001-043B-03 Mainpage

See also
Batteries in space

References

External links
 NASA: PicoSAT 9 Mainpage
 NASA: Coherent Electromagnetic Radio Tomography Mainpage
 NASA: Ionospheric Occultation Experiment Mainpage

Battery (electricity)
Space science experiments
Chemistry experiments